Legislative elections were held in El Salvador in March 1952. The result was a victory for the Revolutionary Party of Democratic Unification, which was the only party to contest the elections as the opposition Renovating Action Party claimed that they were rigged.

Results

References

Bibliography
Political Handbook of the world, 1952. New York, 1953. 
Benítez Manaut, Raúl. 1990. "El Salvador: un equilibrio imperfecto entre los votos y las botas." Secuencia 17:71-92 (mayo-agosto de 1990).
Institute for the Comparative Study of Political Systems. 1967. El Salvador election factbook, March 5, 1967. Washington: Institute for the Comparative Study of Political Systems.
Williams, Philip J. and Knut Walter. 1997. Militarization and demilitarization in El Salvador's transition to democracy. Pittsburgh: University of Pittsburgh Press.

El Salvador
Legislative elections in El Salvador
1952 in El Salvador
One-party elections
Election and referendum articles with incomplete results